Tropinota is a genus of fruit and flower chafers in the beetle family Scarabaeidae. There are about 14 described species in Tropinota.

Species
These 14 species belong to the genus Tropinota:

 Tropinota annabrunae (Crovetti, 1973)
 Tropinota bleusei (Bedel, 1896)
 Tropinota hirta (Poda, 1761)
 Tropinota hirtiformis Reitter, 1913
 Tropinota iberica Rössner, Blochwitz & Hillert, 2018
 Tropinota iec Ruiz, 2015
 Tropinota ilariae Dutto, 2007
 Tropinota paulae Leo, 2010
 Tropinota senicula (Ménétriès, 1832)
 Tropinota spinifrons Reitter, 1889
 Tropinota squalida (Scopoli, 1763)
 Tropinota turanica Reitter, 1889
 Tropinota villiersi Baraud, 1984
 Tropinota vittula Reiche & Saulcy, 1856

References

Further reading

External links

 

Cetoniinae